Anicka Newell (born August 5, 1993 in Denton, Texas) is a Canadian pole vaulter.

Professional
Newell placed 1st at the 2018 Canadian Athletics Championships in Ottawa and cleared  to qualify for the August 11 2018 NACAC Championships in Toronto, but did not clear a height.

Newell placed 7th in the 2018 Commonwealth Games, clearing .

Anicka Newell placed 12th in women's pole vault at the 2017 World Championships, clearing  on her second attempt.

Newell cleared  at Texas State University San Marcos in June 2017, which is the second best all-time in Athletics Canada history, behind Alysha Newman.

In July 2016, she was officially named to Canada's Olympic team. She is eligible to compete for Canada as her mother was born in the country. Newell placed 29th at the 2016 Olympics, clearing .

Her personal bests are:

NCAA
Anicka Newell earned an honorable mentioned All-America award in the pole vault at 2015 NCAA Division I Outdoor Track and Field Championships. Anicka Newell is a two-time Sun Belt Conference Outdoor track and field champion in pole vault for Texas State Bobcats.

High school
Anicka Newell won a New Mexico Activities Association state individual title in the pole vault for Highland High School (Albuquerque, New Mexico) in 2009.

References

External links
 
 
 Anicka Newell profile at All-Athletics
 
 Anicka Newell – 2015 Track and Field profile at Texas State

 
 

1993 births
Living people
Canadian female pole vaulters
Canadian people of American descent
American people of Canadian descent
Sportspeople from Denton, Texas
Athletes (track and field) at the 2016 Summer Olympics
Olympic track and field athletes of Canada
Track and field athletes from Texas
Texas State Bobcats athletes
Athletes (track and field) at the 2018 Commonwealth Games
Commonwealth Games competitors for Canada
Athletes (track and field) at the 2020 Summer Olympics